The Dr. Nathan Davis Awards are presented annually by the American Medical Association (AMA) and awarded to elected and career public servants in national, state, and local governments for outstanding government service. These awards are named for the founder of the American Medical Association, Nathan Smith Davis.

The first Dr. Nathan Davis Awards were presented in 1989. Since then a number of prominent individuals have received a Dr. Nathan Davis Award for outstanding government service.

United States Senator
 1989	Lowell P. Weicker, Jr., Connecticut
 1990 	Orrin G. Hatch, Utah, Edward M. Kennedy, Massachusetts
 1991 	John D. Rockefeller, IV, West Virginia
 1992 	Dale Bumpers, Arkansas, Bob Dole, Kansas
 1993 	Christopher Dodd, Connecticut
 1994 	John H. Chafee, Rhode Island
 1995	Mark O. Hatfield, Oregon
 1996 	Connie Mack, Florida
 1997 	Mike DeWine, Ohio
 1998 	John McCain, Arizona
 1999 	John B. Breaux, Louisiana
 2001 	Richard J. Durbin, JD, Illinois
 2002	Dianne Feinstein, California
 2003 	Pete V. Domenici, New Mexico
 2004 	William H. Frist, MD, Tennessee
 2005 	Max Baucus, Montana, Chuck Grassley, Iowa
 2006 	Jon Kyl, Arizona
 2007 	Gordon H. Smith, Oregon
 2008 	Tom Harkin, Iowa
 2009 	Edward M. Kennedy, Massachusetts
 2012	Debbie Stabenow, Michigan
2015 	Irene Aguilar, MD, Colorado
2017 	John Barrasso, MD, Wyoming

United States Representative
 1989 	Henry A. Waxman, California
 1990 	William H. Natcher, Kentucky
 1991 	J. Roy Rowland, MD, Georgia, C. W. "Bill" Young, Florida
 1992 	Charles B. Rangel, New York
 1993 	Charles W. Stenholm, Texas
 1994 	Nancy Johnson, Connecticut
 1995 	Bill Archer, Texas
 1996 	John Edward Porter, Illinois
 1997 	Marge Roukema, New Jersey
 1998 	Greg Ganske, MD, Iowa, Louis Stokes, Ohio
 1999 	Benjamin L. Cardin, Maryland
 2000 	John D. Dingell, Michigan, Charlie Norwood, DDS, Georgia
 2001 	Michael Bilirakis, Florida
 2002 	Constance A. Morella, Maryland
 2003 	James C. Greenwood, Pennsylvania
 2004 	William M. Thomas, California
 2006 	J. Dennis Hastert, Illinois
 2007 	Sherrod Brown, Ohio
 2008 	Steny H. Hoyer, Maryland
 2009 	Nathan Deal, Georgia
 2010 	Donna Christensen, MD, U.S. Virgin Islands
 2011 	Rosa L. DeLauro, Connecticut
 2012 	Allyson Y. Schwartz, Pennsylvania
2014 	Fred Upton, Michigan 
2015 	Michael C. Burgess, MD, Texas 
2016 	John Boehner, Ohio; and Nancy Pelosi, California
2017 	Phil Roe, MD, Tennessee; and John Nygren, Wisconsin

Member of the Executive Branch by Presidential Appointment
 1989	C. Everett Koop, MD, Surgeon General of the United States
 1990 	Louis W. Sullivan, MD, Secretary of Health and Human Services
 1991 	Margaret M. Heckler, former Secretary of Health and Human Services
 1992 	Antonia C. Novello, MD, Surgeon General of the United States
 1993 	Philip R. Lee, MD, Assistant Secretary for Health, Health and Human Services
 1994 	J. Jarrett Clinton, MD, MPH, former Assistant Secretary of Defense, Regional Health Administrator, Region V, Georgia
 1996 	David Satcher, MD, PhD, Director, Center for Disease Control and Prevention
 1997 	Donna Shalala, Secretary, U.S. Department of Health and Human Services
 1998 	Kenneth W. Kizer, MD, MPH, Under Secretary for Health, U.S. Department of Veterans Affairs
 1999 	Ricardo Martinez, MD, Administrator, National Highway Traffic Safety Administration
 2000 	John M. Eisenberg, MD, Director, Agency for Healthcare Research and Quality, U.S. Department of Health and Human Services
 2001 	Jeffrey P. Koplan, MD, MPH, Director, Centers for Disease Control and Prevention
 2002	William H. Foege, MD, MPH, Former Director, Centers for Disease Control and Prevention
 2003 	Tommy Thompson, Secretary, Department of Health and Human Services
 2004 	Mark B. McClellan, MD, PhD, Commissioner, Food and Drug Administration
 2005 	William Winkenwerder, Jr., MD, MBA, Assistant Secretary of Defense for Health Affairs
 2006	Carolyn Clancy, MD, Director, Agency for Healthcare Research and Quality
 2007 	Margaret J. Giannini, MD, FAAP, Director, Office on Disability, US Department of Health and Human Services
 2009 	Jeffrey William Runge, MD, FACEP, President, Biologue, Inc.
 2010 	Vice Admiral John Mateczun, M.D., Commander, Joint Task Force, National Capital Region Medical
 2011 	R. Gil Kerlikowske, Commander, Director, White House Office of National Drug Control Policy
 2013 	Donald Berwick, M.D., former Administrator of the Centers for Medicare and Medicaid Services
2015 	Bruce G. Gellin, MD, MPH Deputy Assistant Secretary for Health Director, National Vaccine Program Office, Office of the Assistant Secretary for Health, U.S. Department of Health and Human Services
2017 	Andrew M. Slavitt, Acting Administrator, Centers for Medicare & Medicaid Services

Member of the Executive Branch in Career Public Service

 1989 	Donald A. B. Lindberg, MD, Director, Library of Medicine, NIH, Ruth L. Kirschstein, MD, Director, National Institute of General Medical Sciences, NIH
 1991 	William F. Raub, PhD, former Deputy Director, NIH
 1992	Anthony S. Fauci, MD, Director, National Institute of Allergy and Infectious Diseases; Director, Office of AIDS Research
 1993 	Samuel Broder, MD, Director, National Cancer Institute, NIH
 1994	Donald L. Custis, MD, former Surgeon General of the Navy, former Chief Medical Director of Department of Veterans Affairs
 1995 	Kenneth P. Moritsugu, MD, Assistant Surgeon General and Medical Director, Federal Bureau of Prisons
 1996 	Edgar R. Anderson, Jr., MD, former Surgeon General of the U.S. Air Force
 1997 	Kevin R. Kerrigan, MD, Naval Hospital, North Charleston, South Carolina
 1998 	Claude J.M. Lenfant, MD, Director, National Heart, Lung and Blood Institute National Institutes of Health 
 1999 	Rear Admiral Michael L. Cowan, Deputy Director for Medical Readiness, The Joint Staff, Janet Woodcock, MD, Director, Center for Drug Evaluation and Research, Food and Drug Administration
 2000 	Marilyn H. Gaston, MD, Assistant Surgeon General, Associate Administrator Bureau of Primary Health, U.S. Public Health Service, Gerald David Fischbach, MD, Director, National Institute of Neurological Disorders and Stroke, National Institutes of Health
 2001 	James P. Bagian, MD, Director, VA National Center for Patient Safety Department of Veterans Affairs
 2002 	Joseph F. Fraumeni, Jr., MD, Director, Division of Cancer Epidemiology and Genetics National Cancer Institute
 2003 	Judith Elaine Fradkin, MD, Director, Division of Diabetes, Endocrinology and Metabolic Diseases, National Institute of Diabetes and Kidney Diseases, National Institutes of Health
 2004 	Duane F. Alexander, MD, Director, National Institute of Child Health and Human Development National Institutes of Health
 2005	Vice Admiral James A. Zimble, MD (USN Ret.), President Emeritus, Uniformed Services University of the Health Sciences
 2006 	Christopher Allan Percy, MD, Medical Officer and Director of Community Health Services, Northern Navajo Medical Center
 2007 	Douglas R. Lowy, MD, Chief, Laboratory of Cellular Oncology, Center for Cancer Research, National Cancer Institute, National Institutes of Health, John T. Schiller, PhD, Principal Investigator, Neoplastic Disease Section, Laboratory of Cellular Oncology, Center for Cancer Research, National Cancer Institute, National Institutes of Health
 2008 	W. Marston Linehan, MD, Chief, Urologic Oncology Branch Center for Cancer Research National Cancer Institute
 2009	D. Joe Boone, PhD, Associate Director for Science, Division of Laboratory Systems National Center for Preparedness, Detection and Control of Infectious Diseases Centers for Disease Control and Prevention
 2010 	Ira Pastan, MD, Chief of the Molecular Biology Laboratory, National Institute of Health’s Center for Cancer Research
 2011 	William A. Gahl, MD, PhD, Clinical Director, National Human Genome Research Institute, Director, intramural program of the National Institutes of Health Office of Rare Diseases, Director, National Institutes of Health Undiagnosed Diseases Program
 2012 	Leon Esterowitz, PhD, Program Director, Biophotonics Directorate for Engineering, National Science Foundation
 2013 	Thomas R. Insel, M.D., Director, National Institute of Mental Health, Member of the Executive Branch of the Federal Government in Career Military Service
 2000 	Lieutenant General Ronald R. Blanck, DO, USA, Surgeon General of the Army, Rear Admiral Joyce Johnson, DO, MA, Director of Health and Safety, United States Coast Guard
 2002 	Lieutenant General Paul K. Carlton, Jr., MC, CFS, Surgeon General, United States Air Force, Captain Daniel Carucci, MD, Director, Malaria Program, Naval Medical Research Center, United States Navy
 2003 	Captain Daniel Carucci, MD, Director, Malaria Program, Naval Medical Research Center, United States Navy
 2011 	Vice Admiral Adam M. Robinson, Jr., MD, Surgeon General, United States Navy
 2012 	Lieutenant General Eric B. Schoomaker, MD, PhD, Surgeon General and Command General, USA MEDCOM, United States Army
 2013 	Major General Kimberly Siniscalchi, Assistant Surgeon General, Air Force
2014 	Paul K. Carlton, Jr., MD, Lt. Gen., United States Air Force (Ret.)
2015 	Dale P. Sandler, PhD, Senior Investigator, Epidemiology Branch/Chronic Disease Epidemiology Group, National Institutes of Environmental Health Sciences
2016 	Karen Midthun, MD, Director, Center for Biologics Evaluation and Research
2017 	Janine Austin Clayton, MD, Associate Director for Research on Women’s Health and Director of the Office of Research on Women’s Health, National Institutes of Health; and Patrick Conway, MD, MSc, Deputy Administrator for Innovation and Quality and Chief Medical Officer, Centers for Medicare & Medicaid Services

Governor or Statewide Elected Official

 1989 	William Donald Schaefer, Governor, Maryland
 1993 	Brereton C. Jones, Governor, Kentucky
 1994	Mike Leavitt, Governor, Utah
 1995 	Parris Glendening, Governor, Maryland
 1996 	Pierre Howard, Lieutenant Governor, Georgia
 1997 	George Pataki, Governor, New York, Mike Moore, Attorney General, Mississippi
 1998 	Howard Dean, MD, Governor, Vermont
 1999 	Christine Todd Whitman, Governor, New Jersey
 2000 	Mel Carnahan, Governor, Missouri
 2001 	Richard Blumenthal, Attorney General, Connecticut
 2002 	John Oxendine, Commissioner of Insurance and Fire Safety, Georgia
 2004 	Jeb Bush, Governor, State of Florida
 2005 	Drew Edmondson, JD, Attorney General, State of Oklahoma
 2006 	Susan Combs, Commissioner, Texas Department of Agriculture, Joe Manchin, Governor, State of West Virginia
 2008 	Jodi Rell, Governor, State of Connecticut
 2009 	Rick Perry, Governor, State of Texas
 2010 	John Baldacci, Governor, State of Maine, Sandy Praeger, Commissioner, Kansas Insurance Department
 2013 	Anthony Brown, Maryland Lieutenant Governor

See also

 List of awards for contributions to society

References

External links 

 

American Medical Association
Governance and civic leadership awards
American science and technology awards